Mojave or Mohave most often refers to:
Mojave Desert
Mojave River
Mohave people
Mojave language

Mojave or Mohave may also refer to:

Places
 Fort Mojave Indian Reservation
 Mohave County, Arizona
 Mohave Valley, a valley in Arizona
 Mohave Valley, Arizona, a town
 Fort Mohave, Arizona, a town
 Fort Mohave, a historic fort in Arizona
 Mojave, California
 Mojave County, California, a county proposed in the 1990s
 Mojave National Preserve
 Lake Mojave
Mojave (crater) a large crater on Mars

Music
 Mojave (band), a Canadian acoustic and folk band
 Mojave (album), an album by Concrete Blonde
 "Mojave", a song by the Afro Celt Sound System from Volume 5: Anatomic

Transportation
 Mojave Road
 Mojave Air and Space Port
 Sikorsky CH-37 Mojave, a type of helicopter
 Kia Mohave, a sport-utility vehicle
 Piper PA-31 Mojave, a piston engine airplane
 General Atomics Mojave, an unmanned aerial vehicle under development

Other uses
 Mojave (film)
 Mojave language
 macOS Mojave, a computer software version made by Apple
 Mojave rattlesnake
 Mojave Experiment, an advertising campaign by Microsoft
 Mojave High School
 Mohave War

See also
 Mojave 3, a British band
 Mojave Solar Project, a solar power plant in California, United States